Diethylamino hydroxybenzoyl hexyl benzoate (INCI) is an organic compound used in sunscreens to absorb UVA radiation. It is marketed as Uvinul A Plus by BASF. DHHB has an absorption maximum of 354 nm.

DHHB has excellent photostability and compatibility with other UV absorbers and other cosmetic ingredients.

DHHB has been approved for the use in sunscreens in the European Union since 2005 with a maximum of 10 per cent and is also approved in South America, Mexico, Japan and Taiwan. In the United States it can be used for product protection.

References

Sunscreening agents
Benzoate esters
Phenols
Benzophenones
Anilines
Diethylamino compounds